Alfhilda Theodora Adelheid Mechlenburg  (1830–1907), pen name Ivan Ring, was a Danish novelist and short story writer. Brought up by a mother deeply interested in literature, like her younger sisters Fanny Suenssen and Teckla Juel she devoted her life to writing. After first contributing short stories to journals, she published her acclaimed  (Two Stories) in 1872. She went on to publish a series of novels and short stories until 1893, gaining wide popularity both in Denmark and Sweden.

Biography
Born in Copenhagen on 10 February 1930, Alfhilda Theodora Adelheid Suenssen was the eldest daughter of Captain Johan Fedder Carsten Suenssen (1795–1840) and his wife Margaret . She was brought up by a mother deeply interested in literature with two younger sisters who also became writers. In 1864, she married Carl Adolph Rothe Mechlenburg, a Norwegian naval captain, who died in 1868.

Alhilda Suenssen spent her childhood in the south of Jutland where her father was a sea captain in Tønning. When he died in 1840, the family moved to Copenhagen where she grew up in a happy home. As the eldest daughter, she followed her mother's interest in patriotism and literature. When she was 16, she went to visit relatives in Norway but remained there for an extended period and married Captain Mechlenburg in 1864. Their only daughter died as an infant in 1867 and her husband passed away a year later. As a result, Alhilda Mechlenburg returned to Denmark to live with her mother.

Gaining popularity, she went on to publish a series of novels and short stories, completing a total of ten works in the 1880s and early 1890s.

Alfhilda Mechlenburg died in Copenhagen on 10 February 1907.

References

1830 births
1907 deaths
Writers from Copenhagen
19th-century Danish novelists
Danish women novelists
Danish short story writers
Danish women short story writers
19th-century pseudonymous writers
Pseudonymous women writers